Electric Byrd is a jazz fusion album by Donald Byrd released by the Blue Note label in 1970.

Reception
The Allmusic review by Steve Huey awarded the album 4 stars and stated, “Donald Byrd's transitional sessions from 1969-1971 are actually some of the trumpeter's most intriguing work, balancing accessible, funky, Davis-style fusion with legitimate jazz improvisation. Electric Byrd, from 1970, is the best of the bunch, as Byrd absorbs the innovations of Bitches Brew and comes up with one of his most consistent fusion sets of any flavor.”

Track listing
All tracks by Donald Byrd, unless otherwise noted
"Estavanico" - 11:35
"Essence" - 10:42
"Xibaba" (Airto Moreira) - 13:42
"The Dude" - 7:48

Personnel
 Donald Byrd - trumpet
 Jerry Dodgion - alto sax, soprano sax, and flute
 Frank Foster - tenor saxophone and alto clarinet
 Lew Tabackin - tenor saxophone and flute
 Pepper Adams - baritone saxophone and clarinet
 Bill Campbell - trombone
 Hermeto Pascoal - flute (on "Xibaba" only)
 Wally Richardson - guitar
 Duke Pearson - electric piano
 Ron Carter - bass
 Mickey Roker - drums
 Airto Moreira - percussion

References

1970 albums
Blue Note Records albums
Donald Byrd albums
Albums recorded at Van Gelder Studio
Hard bop albums
Albums produced by Duke Pearson